Andrew Munro may refer to:

Andrew Munro (bishop), Bishop of Ross, Scotland in the 15th century
Andrew Munro (mathematician) (1869–1935), Scottish fellow, lecturer in mathematics and bursar of Queens' College, Cambridge
Andrew Munro (footballer) (born 1963), Grenadian international footballer